John Cameron Monjo (born July 17, 1931) is an American diplomat who served as the United States Ambassador to Malaysia from 1987 to 1989, the United States Ambassador to Indonesia from 1989 to 1992 and the United States Ambassador to Pakistan from 1992 to 1995.

References

1931 births
Living people
Ambassadors of the United States to Malaysia
Ambassadors of the United States to Indonesia
Ambassadors of the United States to Pakistan
United States Foreign Service personnel